The Gorizia electoral district (official name: Friuli-Venezia Giulia - 02 uninominal district) was an uninominal district in Italy for the Chamber of Deputies.

Territory 
As required by law, it's part of the Friuli-Venezia Giulia electoral constituency.

The Gorizia-district is composed by 51 comuni:  Aiello del Friuli, Aquileia, Attimis, Campolongo Tapogliano, Capriva del Friuli, Cervignano del Friuli, Cormons, Doberdò del Lago, Dolegna del Collio, Drenchia, Duino-Aurisina, Faedis, Farra d'Isonzo, Fiumicello, Fogliano Redipuglia, Gorizia, Gradisca d'Isonzo, Grado, Grimacco, Lusevera, Mariano del Friuli, Medea, Monfalcone, Monrupino, Moraro, Mossa, Nimis, Prepotto, Pulfero, Resia, Romans d'Isonzo, Ronchi dei Legionari, Ruda, Sagrado, San Canzian d'Isonzo, San Floriano del Collio, San Leonardo, San Lorenzo Isontino, San Pier d'Isonzo, San Pietro al Natisone, Savogna, Savogna d'Isonzo, Sgonico, Staranzano, Stregna, Taipana, Terzo d'Aquileia, Torreano, Turriaco, Villa Vicentina e Villesse.

The district was composed by the province of Gorizia and a part of the Udine and Trieste one.

The district was part of the Friuli-Venezia Giulia - 01 plurinominal district.

Elected

Electoral results

References 

Constituencies established in 2017
Chamber of Deputies constituencies in Italy